Fife Ness is a headland forming the most eastern point in Fife, Scotland. Anciently the area was called Muck Ross, which is a corruption of the Scottish Gaelic Muc-Rois meaning "Headland of the Pigs". It is situated in the area of Fife known as the East Neuk, and forms the muzzle of the dog-like outline of the latter when viewed on a map. Ness is an archaic Norse word meaning "nose".

Fife Ness was  home to a Coastguard station until 2012 and an important Northern Lighthouse Board lighthouse built in 1975 on project by P. H. Hyslop, warning shipping of the headland and the North Carr shoals. The lighthouse was built to replace the last in a series of lightvessels that guarded the treacherous rocks, as it had proved impossible to build a permanent lighthouse on the rocks themselves.

Fife Ness is also surrounded by the links terrain of Crail Golfing Society.

See also

 List of lighthouses in Scotland
 List of Northern Lighthouse Board lighthouses

References

External links

 Northern Lighthouse Board

Landforms of Fife
Headlands of Scotland